Ati Airport  is a public use airport located near Ati, Batha, Chad.

See also
List of airports in Chad

References

External links 
 Airport record for Ati Airport at Landings.com

Airports in Chad
Batha Region